Joanne Ross  (born 1 November 1977) is a Canadian retired female volleyball player, who played as a middle blocker.

She was part of the Canada women's national volleyball team at the 2002 FIVB Volleyball Women's World Championship in Germany.

References

External links
volleyballbc.org

canadawest.org
gothunderbirds

1977 births
Living people
Canadian women's volleyball players
Place of birth missing (living people)
Middle blockers
UBC Thunderbirds women's volleyball players